Kenneth J. Morton (185829 January 1940) was a Scottish entomologist, with a particular interest in the study of Odonata and Neuroptera. He was born at Carluke, Lanarkshire, Scotland, and he died at Edinburgh.

His collections are held at the National Museums of Scotland. They include specimens of dragonflies (from worldwide), caddis flies, lacewings and stoneflies.

References

1858 births
1940 deaths
Scottish entomologists
People from Carluke